Salam "Sam" Rasoul (born June 30, 1981) is an American politician serving as a member of the Virginia House of Delegates from the 11th district. He is one of the two Muslim members of the Virginia General Assembly. In November 2020, Rasoul announced his candidacy for Lieutenant Governor of Virginia in 2021. Despite a significant fundraising advantage, Rasoul lost the Democratic primary to Hala Ayala by a large margin.

Early life and education 
Rasoul was born in Warren, Ohio in 1981, the son of Palestinian immigrants. He earned a Bachelor of Business Administration from Roanoke College and a Master of Business Administration from Hawaii Pacific University.

Career
Rasoul first ran for elected office in 2008 when he challenged incumbent Republican Bob Goodlatte for Virginia's 6th Congressional seat. He lost to Goodlatte by 25 percentage points in the heavily Republican district.

Rasoul was elected to the Virginia House of Delegates in a special election held on January 7, 2014. The special election was held to fill the vacancy created by the November 2013 resignation of Delegate Onzlee Ware. After winning the Democratic primary by 44 votes, Rasoul received nearly 70% of the vote over his Republican opponent Octavia Johnson in the general election. He was inducted into office on January 8, 2014.

Rasoul is a member of the Legislative Black Caucus and the Rural Caucus in the House of Delegates.

He was a candidate in the 2021 Virginia lieutenant gubernatorial election. Rasoul lost to Hala Ayala. If nominated, he would've been the first Muslim candidate to run statewide anywhere in the South and the first Virginia statewide nominee from Roanoke since Ray Garland, who ran for U.S. Senate in 1971.

Personal life
Rasoul and his wife, Layaly, have three children.

Electoral history

References

External links

1981 births
21st-century American businesspeople
21st-century American politicians
American Muslims
American politicians of Palestinian descent
Businesspeople from Virginia
Candidates in the 2008 United States elections
Candidates in the 2021 United States elections
Hawaii Pacific University alumni
Living people
Democratic Party members of the Virginia House of Delegates
Politicians from Roanoke, Virginia
Roanoke College alumni